Leonardo Emilio Comici (21 February 1901 – 19 October 1940) was an Italian mountain climber and caver. He made numerous ascents in the Eastern Alps, particularly in the Dolomites (where he made over 200 first ascents during his career) and in the Julian Alps. Comici was nicknamed the "Angel of the Dolomites".

In the 1930s and 1940s Comici and other climbers (including Riccardo Cassin, Raffaele Carlesso and Alvise Andrich) represented the Italian answer to the achievements of German climbers. Comici perfected the Bavarian technique of mountain climbing, and began the era of "sixth grade" climbing (at that time the highest climbing grade considered humanly surmountable). He was the inventor and proponent of using multi-step aid ladders, solid belays, the use of a trail/tag line, and hanging bivouacs, contributing greatly to the techniques of big wall climbing.

Biography 

Emilio Comici was the son of Antonio Comici and Regina Cartago. A longshoreman in his youth, he began mountain climbing after caving for ten years (1918-1927), following the Trieste tradition of mountaineering represented by Napoleone Cozzi and Julius Kugy. As a caver, Comici set a world depth record of  near Trieste. He began climbing at the suggestion of friends from the Trieste chapter of the Italian Alpine Club, gaining his first experience in the nearby Val Rosandra.

In 1932 Comici moved to Lake Misurina in the municipality of Auronzo di Cadore, where he opened a climbing school. Comici's students included Riccardo Cassin, later a prominent climber. From 1938 to 1940 he served as podestà (mayor) of Sëlva in Val Gardena, where he also directed the ski school. He was a supporter of the Fascist regime of Benito Mussolini, which promoted him by sending him on lecture tours.

He died in an accidental fall caused by a frayed rope on the training cliffs of the Sëlva climbing area in Val Gardena. For a long time the precise circumstances were not reported by the Fascist authorities, who did not want to cast a shadow on the famous figure of Comici.

In addition to his talents as a climber, Comici is remembered for his aesthetic concept of climbing, perceiving it as a means of self-expression through harmonious movement. It was Comici who originated the concept of climbing direttissima routes, following the path a drop of water would take down the mountain. Comici's book Alpinismo Eroico employs rhetoric characteristic of the era in which it was written.

The Rifugio Zsigmondy-Comici, or Zsigmondyhütte, in the Sexten Dolomites is named for Comici and Emil Zsigmondy. The Rifugio Emilio Comici and the Campanile Comici, both in the Langkofel Group, are also named for Comici. A wooden monument memorializes Comici at the foot of the wall in Vallunga where he died.

Ascents

North face of Cima Grande 
From 13 to 14 August 1933 Comici and the brothers Angelo and Giuseppe Dimai made the first ascent of the north face  of the Cima Grande di Lavaredo, thus opening the eponymous Via Comici-Dimai (Comici-Dimai Route) or Comici route. In this climb of 400 meters, they used rope, 150 meters of cord, 90 hooks, climbing slings, 40 carabiners and 80 pitons. There had been several previous failed attempts on the face by other climbers. However, the technique used by Comici's party, and specifically their use of pitons, became the subject of debate among mountaineers. In September 1937, Comici repeated his route as a solo climber in just 3.5 hours. The route was then rated at a difficulty of VI. Today, the rating is VI/A0 (UIAA) or in free climbing VII (UIAA).

Other ascents 
 Via Comici - Summit of Riofreddo - 8 August 1928 - First ascent with Giordano Bruno Fabjan, north face
 Via Comici-Fabjan - Tre Sorelle - 26–27 August 1929 - First ascent with Giordano Bruno Fabjan, VI north face. Considered the first Italian sixth grade climb.
 Via Comici-Benedetti - Monte Civetta - 4–5 August 1931 - First ascent with Giulio Benedetti, VI, A2 northwest face
 Via Comici-Cassin - Zuccone Campelli - 28 May 1933 - First ascent with Riccardo Cassin, Mario Dell'Oro "Boga", Mary Varale and Mario Spreafico "Umett", IV west face
 Yellow Edge - Cima Piccola di Lavaredo - 8–9 September 1933 - First ascent with Mary Varale and Renato Zanutti, VI+ southeast edge
 Via Comici - Punta of Frida - 2 August 1934 - Ascent with Giordano Bruno Fabjan, Vittorio Cottafavi and Gianfranco Pompei, V, VI east face
 Via Comici - Torre Piccola of Falzarego - 10 August 1934 - First ascent with Mary Varale and Sandro Del Torso, V south edge
 Via Comici-Del Torso-Zanutti - Torre Comici - July 1936 - First ascent with Sandro Del Torso and Renato Zanutti, V, VI east face
 Via Comici - [Dito di Dio] - 8–9 September 1936 - frst ascent with Piero Mazzorana and Sandro Del Torso, VI north face
 Via Comici-Dimai - Cima Grande di Lavaredo - 2 September 1937 - Solo ascent in 3.5 hours, north face
 Via Comici - "Salami" in the Sassolungo ("Campanile Comici") - 28–29 August 1940 - First ascent with Severino Casara, VI north face

References

Bibliography 

Smart, David (2020). Emilio Comici: Angel of the Dolomites: Passion, Pitons, Politics and the First Big Walls.

External links 

1901 births
1940 deaths
Alpine guides
Cavers
Italian mountain climbers
Mayors of places in Trentino-Alto Adige/Südtirol
Mountaineering deaths
Sportspeople from Trieste
Sport deaths in Italy